, also known in some markets as NSK Automation, is a large manufacturer of bearings globally and the largest in Japan.  The company produces industrial machinery bearings, precision machinery and parts, and automotive bearings and components.

The company is listed on the Tokyo Stock Exchange, is a component of the Nikkei 225 stock index, and has over 144 overseas operations in 29 countries.
| Capital =  67.2 billion Japanese Yen (as of March 31, 2021)
| Annual Net Sales =  747.6 billion Japanese Yen (Year ended March 31, 2021)

History

Present day business
30,577 employees form a worldwide technology network consisting of over 65 production plants in 14 countries.  Approximately three million new bearings are manufactured per day (from miniature bearings with a one-millimetre bore to bearings with a diameter of five meters).

Gallery

References

External links

 NSK Group Global Web Site 
 NSK European Web Site 
 NSK ASEAN Oceania Web Site 

Bearing manufacturers
Multinational companies headquartered in Japan
Manufacturing companies based in Tokyo
Technology companies of Japan
Auto parts suppliers of Japan
Companies listed on the Tokyo Stock Exchange
Manufacturing companies established in 1916
Japanese companies established in 1916
Japanese brands
Fuyo Group